K. T. Newton Perera (born 8 July 1954) is a Sri Lankan former sprinter. He competed in the men's 4 × 400 metres relay at the 1980 Summer Olympics.

References

External links
 

1954 births
Living people
Athletes (track and field) at the 1980 Summer Olympics
Sri Lankan male sprinters
Olympic athletes of Sri Lanka
Place of birth missing (living people)